The Kingdom of Bhutan is divided into 20 districts. Bhutan is located between the Tibet Autonomous Region of China and India on the eastern slopes of the Himalayas in South Asia.

 are the primary subdivisions of Bhutan. They possess a number of powers and rights under the Constitution of Bhutan, such as regulating commerce, running elections, and creating local governments. The Local Government Act of 2009 established local governments in each of the 20  overseen by the Ministry of Home and Cultural Affairs. The , and their residents, are represented in the Parliament of Bhutan, a bicameral legislature consisting of the National Council and the National Assembly. Each  has one National Council representative.

As of the 2017 census, Thimphu is the most populous , with 138,736 residents; Gasa is the least populous, with 3,952 residents. The largest  by land area is Wangdue Phodrang, encompassing , while the smallest is Tsirang, encompassing .

History

The victorious Penlop of Trongsa Ugyen Wangchuck gained  sovereignty over the entire realm in 1907, marking the establishment of the modern Kingdom of Bhutan and the ascendancy of the House of Wangchuck.

Four  (zones) were established in 1988 and 1989: Zone I, including four western districts, seated at Chhukha; Zone II, including four west-central districts, seated at Damphu; Zone III, including four east-central districts, seated at Geylegphug; and Zone IV, including five eastern districts, seated at Yonphula; to "provide a more efficient distribution of personnel and administrative and technical skills."  acted as the intermediary administrative divisions between the  administration and the central government. Although Thimphu  and Thimphu  (municipality) were within the boundaries of Zone I, they stayed outside the zonal system. By 1991, however, only Eastern  (Zone IV) was fully functional. Zone I, Zone II and Zone III were "indefinitely" disabled in early 1991. Zone IV also ceased to function in mid-1992.  slowly lost relevance and went defunct as they were not included in the Constitution of Bhutan and the Local Government Act of 2009, which repealed the previous local governments and administrative divisions.

The Constitution of 2008 laid basic provisions for an elected  and  courts in each .

Political structure
They are empowered to enforce rules on health and public safety, regulate environmental pollution, advertise in regard to environmental aesthetics, regulate broadcast media in accordance with the Information, Communications, and Media Act, regulate gambling, and raise their own funds.



See also
ISO 3166-2:BT

Notes

Footnotes

References

External links
 Dzongkhag of Bhutan

 
Bhutan, districts
Bhutan 1
Districts, Bhutan
Bhutan geography-related lists